Roxalana may refer to:

Hurrem Sultan (c.1502-1558), the chief consort and legal wife of the Ottoman Sultan Suleiman the Magnificent
Hester Davenport (1642-1717), English actress who used Roxalana as her stage name